Jules Ira "Skip" Kendall (born September 9, 1964) is an American professional golfer. He plays on the PGA Tour Champions and formerly played on the Web.com Tour and the PGA Tour.

Early and personal life
Kendall was born in Milwaukee, Wisconsin, and is Jewish. He attended Nicolet High School in Milwaukee. In high school he played three sports. In soccer, he made the All-State team as a senior. In basketball, he was team MVP and team captain in 1982. In golf, he finished second in the state as both a sophomore and a senior.

He then attended the University of Nevada-Las Vegas, graduating in 1987 with a degree in Business Education. Kendall and his wife Traci have three children, and live in Windermere, Florida.

Golf career
In 1987, Kendall became a professional golfer and was medalist at the PGA Tour Qualifying Tournament in 1992. Kendall has never won a PGA Tour event or a PGA Tour Champions event. However, he did have over two dozen top-10 finishes on the PGA Tour. These include runner-up finishes at the 1998 Buick Invitational, 1999 Canon Greater Hartford Open, 2000 Southern Farm Bureau Classic, and 2004 Bob Hope Chrysler Classic.

The 1999 season was among his best on the PGA Tour. In addition to his second place finish at Hartford he finished T10 at the Players Championship. That season he recorded his highest ranking on the Official World Golf Ranking of #68. Overall he recorded 13 top-25 finishes, made 24 cuts, and earned $962,642. He also earned $1,206,438 in 2004 with seven top-25 finishes.

He also has four Nationwide Tour victories.

Since 2014, Kendall has played on the PGA Tour Champions and has had three top-10 finishes.

In 2015, Kendall missed the cut for the Puerto Rico Open and the Barbasol Championship, scoring 78 in both events on the first round and ended up getting 9-over-par in both tournaments. He did however finish 2015 ranked 69th on the 2015 Champions Tour money list, and finished T10 at the 2015 Shaw Charity Classic.

Kendall is credited with introducing Chris DiMarco to the "claw" putting grip.

Kendall finished his PGA Tour career with over $9.8 million in earnings.

Professional wins (6)

Web.com Tour wins (4)

*Note: The 1994 Nike Inland Empire Open was shortened to 54 holes due to rain.

Web.com Tour playoff record (1–0)

Other wins (2)
1988 Wisconsin State Open
1989 Wisconsin State Open

Playoff record
PGA Tour playoff record (0–3)

Results in major championships

CUT = missed the half-way cut
"T" indicates a tie for a place

Results in The Players Championship

CUT = missed the halfway cut
"T" indicates a tie for a place

Results in World Golf Championships

1Cancelled due to 9/11

QF, R16, R32, R64 = Round in which player lost in match play
NT = No tournament

See also
1992 PGA Tour Qualifying School graduates
1994 Nike Tour graduates
1996 Nike Tour graduates
List of golfers with most Web.com Tour wins
List of Jewish golfers

References

External links

American male golfers
UNLV Rebels men's golfers
PGA Tour golfers
PGA Tour Champions golfers
Korn Ferry Tour graduates
Golfers from Wisconsin
Golfers from Florida
Jewish golfers
Jewish American sportspeople
Sportspeople from Milwaukee
People from Windermere, Florida
1964 births
Living people
21st-century American Jews